George F. Yantis (October 28, 1885 – December 28, 1947) was an American politician in the state of Washington. He served in the Washington House of Representatives. He served as Speaker from 1933 to 1935 and from 1945 to 1947.

References

Democratic Party members of the Washington House of Representatives
1885 births
1947 deaths
20th-century American politicians